Satana Hellstrom is a fictional character appearing in American comic books published by Marvel Comics. Created by Roy Thomas and John Romita Sr., she first appeared in Vampire Tales #2 (October 1973). Satana belongs to the species of magical beings called demons, who are born with supernatural abilities, as a human-succubus hybrid. She is the younger sister of Daimon Hellstrom and the daughter of Marduk Kurios.

Satana, renamed Ana, made her live action debut in the Hulu television series Helstrom, played by Sydney Lemmon.

Publication history

Satana made her debut in Vampire Tales #2 (cover-dated October 1973). She was created by Roy Thomas and John Romita Sr.

She appeared as a regular character in Thunderbolts since issue #155, and remained with the team when the title transitioned into Dark Avengers beginning with issue #175.

Fictional character biography
Satana and Daimon were born in the fictional town of Greentown, Massachusetts. They were the half-human children of Satan (their father was later retconned into a demon named Marduk Kurios, who used the name Satan). Satana and her brother were groomed by their father to be evil, but Daimon rejected these teachings, while Satana embraced them.

When Satana was still a child, her mother, Victoria Wingate, discovered her husband and children's true nature and was driven insane. Daimon was raised by servants, while Satana was taken to her father's particular Hell-dimension (of which there are many in the Marvel Universe) and taught black magic. As a reward for her devotion to him, Satana's father gave her a familiar named Exiter, with whom she formed a close bond. Satana began studying magic under her father and the demon Dansker. In Hell, her soul was bonded with an evil spirit called the Basilisk (not to be confused with the supervillain the Basilisk) in order to increase her magical power.

As an adult, Satana was banished to Earth by the Four as a succubus, draining the souls of men. When she does this, the victim's soul transforms into an ethereal butterfly; Satana then consumes its essence by eating it. She also possesses the ability to gain strength through the use of weapons that were used to kill a living being. In order to do this, she merely places a portion of her own blood on the chosen weapon. She used both her magic and sexual wiles to get the victims she needed.

As a succubus, she stalked victims in New York City, and then in Los Angeles she befriended a Satanist named Ruth Cummins. When Ruth was killed, Satana avenged Ruth's death by destroying Darkos Edge and Harry Gotham. She later battled the Four, a mystic cabal. During Satana's first time in the mortal dimension, she was attacked by Monsignor Jimmy Cruz and his band of soldiers. During this battle, Cruz summoned demons called the N'Garai. Exiter tried to fend them off, but was killed trying to protect his mistress. Though she was too late to save her beloved Exiter, Satana gained her revenge by killing Cruz and consuming his soul. She confronted her father, who was disguised as Miles Gorney, and defied him by saving Michael Heron's soul from him. Some time later, Satana was seemingly destroyed by her brother Daimon Hellstrom, but she defeated the demoness Kthara. She was transformed by the Camarilla of the N'Garai into a human, Judith Camber. She was restored to normal, and destroyed the Camarilla.

Eventually, however, the demon to which she had been bonded began to desire its freedom. The Basilisk managed to put a curse on Doctor Strange, basically turning him into a werewolf. With the help of Spider-Man and Clea, Satana was able to free Strange's soul from the curse, but the Basilisk was released in the process, and stabbed her in the back with a mystical blade. Satana died laughing, however, because their life forces were still bound together; by killing her, the Basilisk had sealed its own fate as well. She had thus sacrificed her life to cure Strange of lycanthropy.

As a supernatural being, however, Satana's death was not permanent. Her spirit returned to her father's realm of Hell for a time, until she and a cabal of demons arranged to have her soul (among others) placed into a soulless body on Earth. There she began to build her powers again, preparing to return to Hell and conquer her father's realm.

At some point, she apparently died again. In the short-lived Marvel series Witches, Satana is resurrected again by Doctor Strange and teamed with two other magic-wielding women to defeat a powerful mystic enemy called the Hellphyr, which was a front for her father Marduk Kurios. According to that series, the three witches formed a coven in order to protect The Tome of Zhered-na (a powerful Book of Shadows belonging to the Kale family) from would-be thieves such as Doctor Strange.

After a brief cameo in Nick Fury's Howling Commandos, Satana has been shown to have reverted to her former wicked ways; reaping souls in Manhattan and plotting her father's overthrow from the comfort of a desecrated church. Despite her fatherly conflict, Satana revealed that for every nine mortal victims she takes, she must offer the 10th victim as supplication to her father. The Hood seeks her out to find out more information about Dormammu. Some time after the fall of the Hood, Luke Cage and Doctor Strange attempt to apprehend her for working with the Hood and to get her to join the Thunderbolts. She is initially resistant, but happily agrees when she realizes she will get to work with the Man-Thing.

In the course of Marvel's Deadpool Team-Up series, Satana loses her soul to four geeks in a high-stakes poker game, and she subsequently seeks out Deadpool's help to get it back. Deadpool discovers the poker-playing geeks are actually demons debating which one will marry Satana in order to become the heir to Hell. Deadpool comes up with a plan to swindle Satana's soul back from the demons: he marries her, binding their souls together. Satana strengthens Deadpool's katana swords with his own soul power to make the inevitable fight with the demon suitor more evenly matched. When the demon comes to take Satana as his bride, Deadpool produces the marriage certificate, denying the demon his bride. The demon then points out the loophole — marriage is only valid until death; therefore, he decides to kill Deadpool. In the ensuing battle, Deadpool uses his soul-enhanced swords to easily dispatch the demon. Afterwards, Satana slips off and leaves Deadpool a letter explaining the inevitable divorce. She indicates she will be keeping half of his soul — her entitlement in the divorce settlement.

She later was involved in a battle with several Hell-lords, attempting to take control of new territories within Hell. She was killed in battle by the mutant / Asgardian god hybrid Tier.

Powers and abilities
Satana is a half-demon/half-human hybrid and a succubus; she has some innate mystical abilities inherited from her father, as well as some that her father granted to her. As a succubus, she is able to extract and feed upon the psychic energy of human male souls to increase her abilities and magical powers. For a time, Satana had to extract and feed upon the psychic energy of human souls periodically to survive. She has the ability to manipulate magical forces for a variety of effects, including inter-dimensional teleportation, levitation, and the projection of concussive bolts of eldritch energy in the form of "soulfire" or hellfire. She also had a limited ability to hypnotize her victims and control their minds psionically. If she touches an object used to kill someone (like a knife or sword) she can absorb its "blood energy" to become stronger in proportion to the souls the weapon has taken. She also has superhuman strength. For a time, she had the ability to contain the Basilisk, a powerful demon, within her spirit and to release it to do her bidding and then return within herself. Satana also trained in the mystic arts and learned how to cast spells and perform witchcraft. She was trained by her father "Satan" in the use of her demonic powers.

Reception

Critical reception 
Marc Buxton of Den of Geek referred to Satana as one of the "greatest monstrous creations that ever sprang from the nightmares of the House of Ideas," writing, "The devil’s daughter herself, Satana, burst open the Marvel black and white scene in the early seventies and was a nice tribute to cleavage laden, Technicolor Hammer Horror of the era. Satana is a succubus who seduced sinners and reduced their souls into butterflies, which she then kept in a little box and at times devours. Some of the finest artists of the Bronze Age worked on Satana’s early adventures starting with Roy Thomas and John Romita Sr. and moving on to Chris Claremont and Estaban Moroto. Her adventures were clearly cut for the same cloth as the Vampirella/Harris Comics stable of fright characters but they were also adult oriented, sexy, and atmospheric." Georgeof Chrysostomou of Screen Rant asserted, "Satana is another classic Marvel character who has been around for a long time despite not becoming widely recognized. She may be another powerful member of the Thunderbolts, but she is one that is traditionally used to working solo, to follow her own self-interests. More of an anti-hero, Satana comes from a Hellish background. With demon parents, not only does Satana carry with her satanic powers, but she is often mistrusted because of her origins. She's manipulative, a sorceress, and incredibly dangerous. Her odd human and demonic heritage certainly makes the character unique."

Accolades 

 In 2015, Den of Geek ranked Satana 20th in their "Marvel’s 31 Best Monsters" list.
 In 2019, CBR.com ranked Satana 2nd in their "10 Daughters Of Marvel Supervillains That Are More Dangerous Than Their Parents" list, 10th in their "10 Most Powerful Earthbound Demons and Devils In Marvel History" list and 13th in their "21 Most Powerful Sorcerer Supreme Candidates" list.
 In 2020, CBR.com ranked Satana 9th in their "Deadpool: 10 Of His Love Interests" list.
 In 2021, Screen Rant ranked Satana 5th in their "10 Strangest Members Of The Thunderbolts" list.
 In 2022, WhatCulture ranked Satana 10th in their "10 Supernatural Heroes We Can’t Wait To See In The MCU" list.
 In 2022, CBR.com ranked Satana 6th in their "10 Best Members Of Marvel's Legion Of Monsters" list.

Other versions

The Supernaturals
In a four-issue alternate reality miniseries called The Supernaturals, Satana is Melissa Ramos, a Catholic girl who is possessed by a demon. She is recruited by a magician named Brother Voodoo, along with alternate versions of the Werewolf, the Black Cat, the Ghost Rider and the Gargoyle to fight a mystical threat. This version of Satana has mystical control over fire, as well as the power to fly. Despite her demonic possession, she has a very pure soul and was going to be offered as a sacrifice by a demon called the Jack 'O' Lantern until she was saved by the Werewolf.

In other media

Television
Satana Hellstrom, renamed Ana Hellstrom, appears in Helstrom, portrayed by Sydney Lemmon.

Video games
 Satana appears as one of the patrons at a demonic bar in Morrigan's ending for Marvel vs. Capcom 3: Fate of Two Worlds and Ultimate Marvel vs. Capcom 3.
 Satana appeared as a boss and an unlockable playable character in Marvel Avengers Alliance.
 Satana appeared as a boss and an unlockable playable character in Marvel Avengers Academy.
 Satana appears as an unlockable playable character in Marvel Future Fight.

Notes
 In Tales to Astonish #3, there is a character called Princess Satana.

References

External links
 Satana bio at Marvel.com
Satana at Don Markstein's Toonopedia. Archived from the original on February 15, 2017. 
 
 
 To Hell With Spandex - retrospective at Den Of Geek
 

Characters created by John Romita Sr.
Characters created by Roy Thomas
Comics characters introduced in 1973
Fictional bisexual females
Fictional characters from Massachusetts
Fictional characters with fire or heat abilities
Fictional half-demons
Fictional succubi
Marvel Comics characters who use magic
Marvel Comics characters with superhuman strength
Marvel Comics devils
Marvel Comics female superheroes
Marvel Comics hybrids
Marvel Comics LGBT superheroes
Marvel Comics television characters
Marvel Comics witches